Margaret Everson is an American lawyer who served as the acting director of the United States National Park Service for six months and the acting director of the United States Fish and Wildlife Service for 15 months during the Trump administration. She is the only person to have headed both the National Park Service and Fish and Wildlife Service.

Early life and education 
Everson was born and raised in Morgantown, West Virginia. Her father worked at West Virginia University in the physics department and later ran its planetarium.

She received a Bachelor of Science degree in biology with a concentration in marine biology from St. Francis College and a Juris Doctor degree from Vermont Law School.

Career 
From 2006 to 2008, Everson was a counselor at the United States Department of the Interior during the George W. Bush administration. She has also worked as an independent consultant for state agencies.

Everson an assistant attorney general of Kentucky and general counsel for the Kentucky Department of Fish and Wildlife Resources.

She was a lobbyist for Ducks Unlimited, a conservation and hunting group, and its chief policy officer for four years, through most of 2018.

She was a counselor to Interior Secretary David Bernhardt and was the principal deputy director of the Fish and Wildlife Service.

National Park Service 
Bernhardt selected Everson in August 2020 to replace David Vela as acting director of the United States National Park Service. Everson was the fourth acting director of the Park Service under President Donald Trump.

In September 2020, two environmental groups asked a federal court to remove Everson as head of the Park Service, arguing she was illegally appointed. The Trump administration was the first in the Park Service's history not to name a permanent director, a job that requires Senate confirmation. Her appointment ended with the Trump administration, on January 20, 2021.

See also 

 Environmental policy of the Donald Trump administration
 National Park Service
 Organization of the National Park Service

References 

Date of birth missing (living people)
Living people
American lobbyists
National Park Service personnel
United States Fish and Wildlife Service personnel
People from Morgantown, West Virginia
St. Francis College alumni
Trump administration personnel
Vermont Law and Graduate School alumni
Year of birth missing (living people)